Cavalry School may refer to:
 École de cavalerie, Saumur, a French military training establishment at Saumur in western France
 Rytterskole (Danish for 'cavalry school'), an 18th-century Danish type of school for children in cavalry districts
 United States Army Cavalry School, a training establishment of the United States Army